Urs Samyuktha Paksha (Urs United Party),  political party in the Indian state of Karnataka. USP was founded by businessman Hari L. Khoday on 16 January 2004. The goal of USP is to work for the rights of the Backward Castes. USP considers that it upholds the legacy of the former Chief Minister of  Karnataka, Devaraj Urs. In the Lok Sabha elections 2004 USP launched three candidates.

External links
Election Result 2004

Political parties in Karnataka
Political parties established in 2004
2004 establishments in Karnataka